John Hastings, 3rd Earl of Pembroke (October 137230 December 1389) was the son of John Hastings, 2nd Earl of Pembroke and Anne Manny, 2nd Baroness Manny. He was also Baron Abergavenny.

Infant Inheritance 

He succeeded his father as an infant in 1375, and also received lands from the death of William de Cantilupe the same year.

Marriage 

He married Elizabeth of Lancaster the daughter of John of Gaunt, in 1380, but the marriage was unconsummated (he was 8 and she 17 at the time of the marriage) and was annulled after she became pregnant by John Holland, whom she subsequently married.

He subsequently married Philippa Mortimer, daughter of Edmund Mortimer, 3rd Earl of March, but had no children, dying shortly afterwards in a jousting accident.

Death in a Joust 

Richard II held his Christmas court at Woodstock Palace in 1389, and the seventeen-year-old Pembroke took part in the Christmas sports, including jousting. While running a course against Sir John Des, he was struck in the groin by his opponent's lance and subsequently died of his injuries. Upon his death, the Earldom of Pembroke and the Barony of Manny  became extinct, while the Barony of Hastings passed to his cousin, John Hastings, 6th Baron Hastings, heir by the half blood through his great grandfather. Also the manor of Tunstall, Kent passed to his cousin Reginald Grey, 3rd Baron Grey de Ruthyn. His cousins litigated for years regarding property rights, but resolution was delayed during the minority of Edward Hastings, 7th Baron Hastings, brother of the 6th Baron Hastings. When the 3rd Baron Grey de Ruthyn prevailed at law as heir by the whole blood through his paternal grandmother Elizabeth de Hastings, the 7th Baron Hastings refused to pay court costs while the case was on appeal (to not create a presumption of acquiescence based on the contemporary rules of evidence) and was imprisoned in chains.

Pembroke was described by the chronicler as being mourned by the common people as well as the nobility, by reason of his kind and generous nature.

See also
 Inquisition Post Mortem #885.

Ancestry

References

Translation from Historia Vitae et Regni Ricardi Secundi

|-

1372 births
1389 deaths
03
John Hastings, 3rd Earl of Pembroke
14th-century English people
Barons Hastings
3